Cameron Michael Henderson Gibson MBE (born 3 December 1942) is a former rugby union player who represented Ireland and the British and Irish Lions at international level.

Gibson is regarded as one of the greatest rugby union players; upon his induction into the IRB Hall of Fame in May 2011, former teammate and fellow Hall of Fame inductee Syd Millar said about Gibson that:

... [he] was one of the finest players of his generation, one of the finest players ever to represent Ireland and the British & Irish Lions and a man who epitomised the very ethos of the Game and its values.

Early life
Gibson was educated at Campbell College in Belfast, and went on to study law at Queens' College, Cambridge.

Club career
Gibson played the bulk of his career for North of Ireland F.C. ("North")
While studying, Gibson played for Cambridge University.
In February 1966 he played for London Irish against St Mary's Hospital.
He continued playing club rugby until 42.

International career

Ireland

Gibson's distinguished career began with Ireland in 1964, and he earned his 69th and final cap in the second and final test win against Australia in Sydney in 1979 at age 36. A versatile player, he represented his country in four different positions. Gibson had a distinguished international career; the Irish solicitor's all-round talent marked him out as arguably the greatest centre of any era, and certainly, prior to his transfer to centre, the finest fly half of any era. Gibson's brilliance lay in the perception and timing of his attacking play, the focus and anticipation of his defence, and the rare dedication and commitment with which he applied himself across a 15-year international career in which he appeared in a then-world record 81 Tests.

Famed as much for his great hands and line-breaking ability as his tactical skills and rapier boot, Gibson scored 112 Test points (9 tries, 16 penalties, 7 conversions and 6 drop goals) for Ireland in a career that also saw him tour five times with the British & Irish Lions.

Gibson's record Ireland caps haul of 69 was overtaken by lock Malcolm O'Kelly against Scotland in February 2005. The mark had lasted for 26 years. His record of 56 appearances in the Five Nations (now Six Nations) was not equalled until countryman Ronan O'Gara reached the mark in Ireland's final match of the 2011 Six Nations.

British and Irish Lions
Gibson toured with the British and Irish Lions five times.

On the 1968 tour to South Africa, Gibson made history in the opening Test by becoming the first replacement in international rugby, and showed his stamina by playing in 11 of the final 13 matches after Welsh fly-half Barry John had been invalided out of the tour.

John would return for the following tour, the now famous 1971 tour to New Zealand, where he would star at centre. Alongside captain John Dawes, Gibson formed a brilliant midfield combination, and with Gareth Edwards, Barry John, Gerald Davies, J.P.R. Williams and David Duckham, they constituted arguably the finest backline in Lions history.

The 1971 tour remains to date the Lions' sole series victory over the All Blacks, and it was on this tour that Gibson won the respect of the New Zealand rugby public with his attacking flair and timing.

Gibson's work commitments saw him join the 1974 Lions in South Africa as a replacement during the second half of the tour. Gibson was renowned for his humility, and demonstrated it here by willingly playing understudy to the new Test pairing of Ian McGeechan and Richard Milliken.

Gibson was selected for his fifth Lions tour in 1977, equalling fellow Irishman Willie John McBride's record. However, back and hamstring problems meant that Gibson was unable to compete for a test place.

Representative teams
Gibson played for a combined Scotland/Ireland XV in the 1970 Centenary of RFU celebration match against a combined England/Wales XV and again in the 1972 Scottish Rugby Union Centenary match.

Honours
He was awarded an MBE for services to the game.

When the International Rugby Hall of Fame was instituted in 1997, Gibson was one of the initial fifteen inductees. Upon his induction into the IRB Hall of Fame in 2011, Gibson was quick to pay tribute to his teammates, also calling rugby the greatest team sport.

In January 2012 Gibson was inducted into the Belfast Telegraph Hall of Fame.

In an interview in 2011, Irish rugby great Brian O'Driscoll praised Gibson's contribution to Irish rugby:

At times when Irish rugby wasn't successful Mike was always the shining light. He played international rugby for 15 years and that speaks volumes about him. He was a magnificent player and a true ambassador for the game.

Professional career
Since retirement, Gibson has practised as a solicitor in Belfast, where he continues to play an active role in the rugby community. Fellow Irish international David Humphreys trained as a solicitor in Gibson's firm.

References

External links
Mike Gibson at sporting-heroes.net
ESPN Profile
Barbarians Profile

Irish rugby union players
Ireland international rugby union players
Ulster Rugby players
Lansdowne Football Club players
Wanderers F.C. (rugby union) players
London Irish players
Rugby union centres
Rugby union players from Belfast
Solicitors from Northern Ireland
World Rugby Hall of Fame inductees
Cambridge University R.U.F.C. players
North of Ireland F.C. players
People educated at Campbell College
British & Irish Lions rugby union players from Ireland
Barbarian F.C. players
1942 births
Living people
Ireland international rugby sevens players
Alumni of Queens' College, Cambridge